Tarik Phillip (born August 10, 1993) is a British-American professional basketball player for the London Lions of the British Basketball League (BBL) and the EuroCup. He played college basketball for West Virginia.

Early life and high school
Phillip was born in Brooklyn to a Grenadian father and an English mother. He began high school at Christ the King Regional High School in Middle Village, Queens before transferring to Brooklyn College Academy before his sophomore year and helped lead the team to the Public Schools Athletic League title in his first season with the Bobcats. Phillip did not play basketball as a senior due to eligibility issues and completed a fifth year at Queen City Prep in Charlotte, North Carolina. After averaging 26 points and seven rebounds per game, Phillip committed to play for South Carolina but was ultimately ruled academically ineligible to play.

College career

Independence CC
After failing to qualify academically to play for South Carolina, Phillip began his collegiate career at Howard College in Big Spring, Texas and sat out a season before transferring to Independence Community College. Despite missing the first 14 games due to academic issues, he was named the Kansas Jayhawk Community College Conference Eastern Division Player of the Year and was named an honorable mention Junior College All-American after averaging 18.7 points, 6.7 rebounds and 4.3 assists over the final 18 games of the season.

West Virginia
Phillip spent the final three seasons of his eligibility with the Mountaineers. He averaged 4.1 points and 12.9 minutes off the bench in his first year with the team. As a junior, he established himself as a key reserve and averaged 9.3 points and 2.5 rebounds per game and shot 40.9 percent from three. As a senior, Phillip averaged 9.3 points, 3.2 assists, 3.0 rebounds, and 2.0 steals and was named the Big 12 Sixth Man of the Year.

Professional career

Szolnoki (2017–2018)
Phillip signed with Szolnoki Olaj KK of the Hungarian Nemzeti Bajnokság I/A (NB I/A) on August 17, 2017. Phillip averaged 5.0 points, 2.9 rebounds, 1.2 assists and 1.5 steals over 17 NB I/A games and 7.8 points, 2.9 rebounds, 1.4 assists and 2.2 steals in 14 FIBA Europe Cup games before leaving the team in February, 2018.

Clavijo (2018)
After leaving Szolnoki, Phillip signed with CB Clavijo of the Spanish Second Division (LEB Oro) on February 13, 2018. He averaged 10.6 points, 2.4 rebounds, and 1.7 assists in 11 games.

Memphis Hustle (2018–2019)
Phillip was signed by the Memphis Hustle of the NBA G League following a successful tryout with the team. Phillip averaged 13.8 points, 4.9 rebounds, 3.8 assists and 1.6 steals in 48 games (34 starts) with the Hustle.

Washington Wizards (2019)
The Washington Wizards announced that they had signed Phillip on April 9, 2019, the last day of the 2018–19 NBA season. He played for the Wizards' Summer League team, averaging 5.7 points, 1 rebound, 1.2 assists and 1 steal over four games.

Tofaş (2019–2020)
Phillip was released from his contract with the Wizards in order to sign with Tofaş of the Basketbol Süper Ligi (BSL) on August 13, 2019. Phillip was named the Player of the Week for the first week of the 2019–20 EuroCup by Eurobasket.com after scoring 17 points with 10 rebounds and seven assists in an 84–71 win against Limoges CSP.

Hapoel Jerusalem (2020)
On August 9, 2020, Phillip signed with Hapoel Jerusalem of the Israeli Premier League. In his debut, he posted 21 points, 5 assists and 3 steals in a 103-96 win against Maccabi Rishon LeZion. Phillip left the team on November 18.

Return to Tofaş (2020–2021)
On November 20, 2020, he signed with Tofaş of the Turkish Basketbol Süper Ligi (BSL), returning to the club for second time.

Reyer Venezia (2021–2022)
On July 18, 2021, he signed with Reyer Venezia of the Italian LBA. Reyer Venezia also plays in the EuroCup

San Pablo Burgos (2022)
On January 31, 2022, Phillip signed with San Pablo Burgos of the Liga ACB.

London Lions (2022–present)
On August 10, 2022, Phillip signed with the London Lions of the British Basketball League (BBL).

International career
In 2017, Phillip was called up to the Great Britain men's national basketball team roster to play in the qualifiers for the 2019 FIBA Basketball World Cup. He played in six games, averaging 6.5 points, 3.5 rebounds and 1.7 assists as Britain finished 27th overall and failed to qualify. Phillip was named to Great Britain's roster for the EuroBasket 2022 qualifiers.

References

External links
G-League profile
RealGM Profile
EuroBasket profile
West Virginia Mountaineers bio

1993 births
Living people
American expatriate basketball people in Hungary
American expatriate basketball people in Israel
American expatriate basketball people in Italy
American expatriate basketball people in Spain
American expatriate basketball people in Turkey
American men's basketball players
American people of Grenadian descent
British men's basketball players
British people of Grenadian descent
Basketball players from New York City
CB Clavijo players
CB Miraflores players
Hapoel Jerusalem B.C. players
Independence Pirates men's basketball players
Memphis Hustle players
Reyer Venezia players
Shooting guards
Sportspeople from Brooklyn
Szolnoki Olaj KK players
Tofaş S.K. players
West Virginia Mountaineers men's basketball players